Aşk-ı Memnu may refer to:

 Aşk-ı Memnu (novel), an 1899  Turkish romance novel by Halit Ziya Uşaklıgil
 Aşk-ı Memnu (1975 TV series), a Turkish  television miniseries, adapted from the novel
 Aşk-ı Memnu (2008 TV series), a Turkish romantic drama television series, adapted from the novel